Björn Söderberg (April 1, 1958 – October 12, 1999) was a Swedish union active syndicalist who was murdered in Sätra, Stockholm on October 12, 1999.

Murder 
Björn Söderberg had made a tip to the newspaper Arbetaren owned by Sveriges Arbetares Centralorganisation (SAC) about his colleague Robert Vesterlund. This tip led to an article in Arbetaren on September 16, 1999 revealing Vesterlund, member of the board of the local union, as a member of the fascist organisation Nationell Ungdom. As a result of this Robert Vesterlund resigned his job and was forced out of the union.

This was the motive for the two men, Hampus Hellekant and Björn Lindberg-Hernlund (both with strong ties to Nationell Ungdom), who visited Björn Söderberg at his apartment in Sätra on October 12 and shot him to death.

Aftermath 
Hampus Hellekant and Björn Lindberg-Hernlund were convicted of murder in the Court of Appeal and Jimmy Niklasson, also a member of Nationell Ungdom, was convicted of “grovt vapenbrott och skyddande av brottsling” – serious weapon-related crime and protecting a criminal.

On October 23, a crowd of 20,000 people gathered on Medborgarplatsen to take part in an anti-fascist meeting and October 12 was appointed Day of Civil Courage by SAC. On that day a prize in civil courage is given in memory of Söderberg’s murder.

References

1958 births
1999 deaths
Deaths by firearm in Sweden
People murdered in Sweden
Swedish murder victims
Syndicalists
Swedish anarchists
Anarcho-syndicalists
Murdered anarchists
Neo-Nazism in Sweden